Ellis is an unincorporated community in Muskingum County, in the U.S. state of Ohio.

History
Ellis was founded in 1870 as Ellis Station, a depot on the Cincinnati and Muskingum Valley railroad. The community was named for the local Ellis family. A post office called Ellis was established in 1879, and remained in operation until 1935.

References

Unincorporated communities in Muskingum County, Ohio
1870 establishments in Ohio
Unincorporated communities in Ohio